Till is a surname. Notable people with the surname include:

Barry Till (born 1923), Anglican priest, author and academic
Benjamin Till (born 1974), English composer, director and film maker
Brian Till (born 1960), American racecar driver
Darren Till (born 1992), English mixed martial artist who competes in the UFC
Darrell Till (born 1975), English singer-songwriter, composer, and author
Emmett Till (1941–1955), African-American youth whose murder helped propel the American Civil Rights Movement onto the national stage
Eric Till (born 1929), British film and television director
Farrell Till (born 1933), American anti-Christian campaigner
James Till (born 1931), Canadian biophysicist
John Coates Till (1843-1910), Anglo-American marionettist, entertainer, and husband of Louisa Olive Middleton Till
John Till (1945–2022), Canadian musician
John Christian Till (1762–1844), American composer
Louis Till (1922-1945), American soldier and father of Emmett Till
Louisa Till (1854-1913), Anglo-American marionettist, entertainer, and wife of John Coates Till
Lucas Till (born 1990), American actor
Mamie Till (1921–2003), mother of Emmett Till
Michael Till (born 1935), English clergyman, Dean of Winchester 1996–2005
Peter Till (born 1963), English former boxer
Peter Till (born 1985), English footballer
Philip Till, Canadian talk show host
Stewart Till (born 1951), British film executive
William Till (c.1697–1766), colonial-era American politician, jurist, and merchant